Montreal County was an electoral district of the Legislative Assembly of the Parliament of the Province of Canada, in Canada East.  It was created in 1841 and was partially based on the previous electoral district of the same name for the former Legislative Assembly of Lower Canada.  However, a significant part of the old district was carved out of it and formed the new electoral district of Montreal, a linguistic and ethnic gerrymander designed to gain support for the new Province of Canada, which had resulted from the merger of Lower Canada and Upper Canada.

The new Montreal County was represented by one member in the Legislative Assembly. The electoral district was abolished in 1867, upon the creation of Canada and the province of Quebec.

Boundaries 

Montreal County was located on the Island of Montreal, and included areas not included in the electoral district for the municipality of Montreal.  The Montreal County district actually included a significant portion of the municipality, as a result of the boundaries drawn by the Governor General, Lord Sydenham, as part of his goal to increase the voting strength of voters of British background, at the expense of the francophone Canadiens.

The Union Act, 1840 merged the two provinces of Lower Canada and Upper Canada into the Province of Canada, with a single Parliament.  The separate parliaments of Lower Canada and Upper Canada were abolished.Union Act, 1840, 3 & 4 Vict., c. 35, s. 2. 

The Union Act provided that the pre-existing electoral boundaries of Lower Canada and Upper Canada would continue to be used in the new Parliament, unless altered by the Union Act itself. The Montreal County electoral district of Lower Canada had included all of the Island of Montreal.  The Union Act did not directly change the boundaries of Montreal County, but did so in an indirect way.

The Union Act created a new electoral district of Montreal, and gave the Governor General the power to draw the boundaries for that new district.  Any parts of the city which were not included in the new district would be included in the adjoining district, namely Montreal County.  The Governor General, Lord Sydenham, was determined to ensure that candidates who favoured the recent union of Lower Canada and Upper Canada would be elected to the Legislative Assembly.  As part of his plan to ensure that goal, he drew the boundaries of the new Montreal district to favour the voters of British background, who generally favoured the union, and to exclude francophone Canadien voters, who tended to oppose it.  The new Montreal district was carved out of the territory of the former Montreal County.  The result was an ethnic and linguistic gerrymander, which effectively disenfranchised francophone voters of Montreal in the 1841 election.

Members of the Legislative Assembly 

Montreal County was represented by one member in the Legislative Assembly.  The following were the members of the Legislative Assembly from Montreal County.

Notes

Abolition 

The district was altered to some extent by the redistribution in 1853.  It was eventually abolished on July 1, 1867, when the British North America Act, 1867 came into force, splitting the Province of Canada into Quebec and Ontario.

References 

Electoral districts of Canada East